Ramón Diokno y Marasigan (March 28, 1886 – April 21, 1954) was a Filipino statesman, jurist, Associate Justice, and one of the foremost nationalists of his generation. He fought the American Parity Rights Amendment and was one of four senators to be ousted so that the amendment may be ratified. He later became Associate Justice under Ramon Magsaysay but had the shortest term when he died two months and eleven days later. He is the father of former Senator Jose W. Diokno, the father of human rights and founder of the Free Legal Assistance Group (FLAG), and grandfather of Atty. Jose Manuel Tadeo "Chel" Diokno, the dean of the De La Salle University (DLSU) Tañada-Diokno College of Law. Justice Diokno is famous for writing the ponencia in the Re: Cunanan case.

Early life 
Diokno was born in Taal, Batangas on March 28, 1886, as the only son to Ananías Diokno, head of the Visayan forces during the Philippine Revolution and Philippine–American War, and Paulina Maracigan Marasigan. Diokno had four half-siblings from his father's second wife Emilia Rivera. Diokno's ancestor was the governor-general Felix Berenguer de Marquina, the namesake of Marikina City. Diokno received his primary instruction in Taal and continued his studies in a private school in Manila and in Colegio de San Antonio de Padua under Supreme Court Justice Ignacio Villamor.

Career 
Diokno was admitted to the practice of law in April 1905. While he was a student, he was the founding president of the Asociacion Escolar de Filipinas. He also founded the Colegio la Ilustracion and Rizal University, where he taught as a professor. He was editor of La Fraternidad and El Nacionalista, and was president of the Union del Trabajo de Filipinas and the Union de Marinus de Filipinas. He was a Mason at the Sinkuan Lodge and in charge of the Hilad Lodge, which he led for two years. He then influenced his son Jose "Ka Pepe" Diokno to join the Nilad Lodge No. 12. He was also one of the founders of the Gram Logia Regional de Filipinas.

He was also corporate counsel for the Philippine National Bank, Manila Railroad Company, Manila Hotel Company, National Loan and Investment Board, Metropolitan Water District, National Development Company, Cebu Portland Cement Company, and National Produce Exchange.

Public servant
He won the special election for city councilor in the Northern District of Batangas in 1918 and in 1933. In the September 17, 1935 Commonwealth Election, he was the chief campaign manager of Manuel L. Quezon and was appointed Corporate Counsel.

Later life
Diokno married Martha Fello and had three children. After her death, he married a Filipino-American of English descent named Leonor Wright y Garcia, and they had ten children. Diokno frequently only spoke Spanish and banned English at home, forcing his son Ka Pepe to learn from a tutor. His son eventually topped the bar exam in 1944 and defended him in many cases against the abuses of the government. He died in 1954 during a Supreme Court trip in Baguio of a heart attack and was buried in his requested hometown of Taal, Batangas.

Ancestry

References 

1886 births
1954 deaths
20th-century Filipino politicians
Senators of the 1st Congress of the Philippines
People from Taal, Batangas
People from Manila
Tagalog people
Filipino Freemasons
Filipino revolutionaries
Nacionalista Party politicians
Members of the House of Representatives of the Philippines from Batangas
Filipino nationalists
Associate Justices of the Supreme Court of the Philippines
Diokno family